Nareline is a bio-active alkaloid isolated from Alstonia boonei, a medicinal tree of West Africa.

Notes
 A Review of the Ethnobotany and Pharmacological Importance of Alstonia boonei De Wild (Apocynaceae)

Tryptamine alkaloids
Heterocyclic compounds with 6 rings
Methoxy compounds